The National Library of Kuwait is the national library and legal deposit and copyright library for Kuwait. It was founded in 1923 through the efforts of several Kuwaiti writers, and received its collection from the library of the Kuwaiti Charitable Society, which was founded in 1913.

In 1994, Amiri Decree No. 52/1994 officially ordered the creation of the National Library of Kuwait, and entrusted it with the responsibility of collecting, organizing, preserving, and documenting the national heritage and the state of Kuwait's intellectual and cultural output.

See also
 List of national libraries

External links 
  Official site

1923 establishments in Kuwait
Government of Kuwait
Kuwaiti culture
Kuwait
Libraries established in 1923
Libraries in Kuwait
Cultural centers in Kuwait
Buildings and structures in Kuwait
Education in Kuwait